In baseball, a pinch hitter is a substitute batter. Batters can be substituted at any time while the ball is dead (not in active play); the manager may use any player who has not yet entered the game as a substitute. Unlike basketball, American football or ice hockey, and in a similar way to association football, baseball does not have a "free substitution rule" (at the professional level) and thus the replaced player is not allowed back into that game. The pinch hitter assumes the spot in the batting order of the player whom he replaces. Pinch hitters are commonly used to replace a weak hitter (often the pitcher) or to gain a platoon advantage.

The player chosen to be a pinch hitter is often a backup infielder or outfielder whose defensive skills are limited. In Major League Baseball (MLB), catchers are less likely to be called upon to pinch-hit, because most teams have only two catchers. Pitchers are rarely used as pinch hitters, because they tend to be worse hitters than other players on the team. However, some pitchers have been used as pinch hitters; this tactic had almost vanished by the 1980's, but is now seeing a comeback as benches have diminished due to injuries, offering few other options beyond the 12 or 13 pitchers. 

The American League of MLB (and, since 2022, the National League), the Pacific League of Nippon Professional Baseball (NPB), the KBO League (in Korea), the Liga Mexicana de Béisbol (in México), and various other leagues, use the designated hitter rule, such that pitchers seldom bat. This eliminates one possible situation in which a pinch hitter may be more desirable.

For statistical and scorekeeping purposes, the pinch hitter is denoted by PH.

Usage
Pinch hitters are often used to replace a starting player because of injury or when the pinch hitter is thought to have a better chance of reaching base or helping other runners to score.

When the designated hitter rule is not in effect (e.g., in the Central League in NPB, in the National League before 2022 and American League before 1973 in MLB and leagues such as the Atlantic League which use the double hook rule), pinch hitters are often substituted for the pitcher in the middle or late innings of a game. This is because pitchers are often poor hitters and may become less effective after six to seven innings of pitching. Thus, as the manager often plans to replace the pitcher in the next inning, the major downside of using a pinch hitter, namely that the player being replaced cannot re-enter the game, is taken away.

This use of a pinch hitter is often part of a double switch, in which a relief pitcher replaces a defensive player who will not bat soon, and at the same time a defensive player replaces the pitcher who is scheduled to bat soon. If a player acts as a pinch hitter and his team bats around in the inning, he may come to the plate a second time. The second (and subsequent) times he bats in the inning are not considered pinch-hitting appearances.

The pinch hitter need not (but may) assume the same position as the player for whom he pinch-hits as long as some other player assumes that position. For example, on August 16, 2009, the Washington Nationals' Ryan Zimmerman pinch-hit for second baseman Alberto González and then remained in the game at third base, with previous third baseman Ronnie Belliard switching positions to play second base after the change. Alternatively, the manager may designate another player to replace the pinch hitter; this scenario is common when a team pinch-hits for a pitcher without executing a double switch, such that the new pitcher then replaces the pinch hitter and assumes the previous pitcher's place in the batting order.

If a pinch hitter hits for the DH, the new pinch hitter stays in the game as a DH, and may not be used in the field. If the new DH does take the field, then the team forfeits the DH for the remainder of the game (thus, causing the pitcher to enter the batting order).

MLB all-time pinch hit leaders

This is a list of players with the most pinch hits in Major League Baseball history. Names which appear in bold are active players. Includes games through July 22, 2011.

All-time pinch hit records
 Most pinch-hit at-bats
 Lenny Harris – 804
 Most pinch hits career
 Lenny Harris – 212
 Most pinch-hit grand slams
 Rich Reese, Willie McCovey, Ron Northey – tied with three each
 Most pinch-hit home runs
 Matt Stairs – 23
 Most pinch-hit game-winning grand slams
 Brooks Conrad – 2
 Most pinch-hit grand slams by one team in a season
 Atlanta Braves – 3 total in 2010

Single season pinch hit records
Most pinch hit games
Ichiro Suzuki – 109 (2017)
Most pinch hit plate appearances
Ichiro Suzuki – 109 (2017)
Most pinch hit at-bats
Ichiro Suzuki – 100 (2017)
Most pinch hits
John Vander Wal – 28 (1995) 
Most consecutive pinch hits
Dave Philley and Rusty Staub – tied with eight each (1958 and 1983) 
Most pinch hit home runs
Dave Hansen and Craig Wilson – tied with seven each (2000 and 2001)
Most pinch hit game winning grand slam home runs
Brooks Conrad – 2 (2010)
Most pinch hit home runs for a team in a game
St. Louis Cardinals (Jeremy Hazelbaker, Aledmys Diaz and Greg Garcia) – 3 (April 8, 2016)
Most pinch hit RBI
Joe Cronin, Jerry Lynch, Rusty Staub – tied with 25 each (1943, 1961 and 1983)
Most pinch hit walks
Matt Franco – 20 (1999)

Pinch hit home runs

 The following players have been called into a game and hit a pinch-hit home run during their first ever Major League at-bat:

{| class="wikitable"
|+ American League
|-
! style="width:120px;"|Date
! style="width:120px;"|Name
! style="width:120px;"|Team
! style="width:120px;"|Inning
|-
| April 30, 1937
| Ace Parker
| Philadelphia
| 9th Inning
|-
| September 5, 1962
| John Kennedy
| Washington
| 6th Inning
|-
| June 19, 1963
| Gates Brown
| Detroit
| 5th Inning
|-
| September 30, 1964
| Bill Roman
| Detroit
| 7th Inning
|-
| September 12, 1965
| Brant Alyea
| Washington
| 6th Inning
|-
| August 7, 1968
| Joe Keough
| Oakland
| 8th Inning
|-
| April 7, 1977
| Alvis Woods
| Toronto
| 5th Inning
|}

{| class="wikitable"
|+ National League
|-
! style="width:120px;"|Date
! style="width:120px;"|Name
! style="width:120px;"|Team
! style="width:120px;"|Inning
|-
| April 21, 1898
| Bill Duggleby
| Philadelphia
| 2nd inning
|-
| April 14, 1936
| Eddie Morgan
| St. Louis
| 7th Inning
|-
| May 21, 1948
| Les Layton
| New York
| 9th Inning
|-
| September 14, 1950
| Ted Tappe
| Cincinnati
| 8th Inning
|-
| April 12, 1955
| Chuck Tanner
| Milwaukee
| 8th Inning
|-
| September 8, 1998
| Marlon Anderson
| Philadelphia
| 7th Inning
|-
| April 17, 2001
| Gene Stechschulte
| St. Louis
| 6th Inning
|-
| August 21, 2005
| Mike Jacobs
| New York
| 5th Inning
|-
| September 1, 2005
| Jeremy Hermida
| Florida
| 7th Inning
|-
| September 4, 2006
| Charlton Jimerson
| Houston
| 6th Inning
|-
| September 8, 2008
| Mark Saccomanno
| Houston
| 5th Inning
|-
| August 28, 2009
| John Hester
| Arizona
| 6th Inning
|}

See also

 Designated hitter
 Pinch runner

References

External links
Pinch Hitting Records from Baseball Almanac

Batting (baseball)
Baseball positions
Baseball terminology